Brenda Kupchick (born November 29, 1964) is an American politician who has served as the First Selectwoman of Fairfield, Connecticut since 2019. She previously served in the Connecticut House of Representatives from the 132nd district from 2011 to 2019. She resigned on November 22, 2019, after she was elected First Selectwoman of Fairfield, Connecticut.

Kupchick served on the Fairfield Representative Town Meeting, Fairfield’s legislative body 1999-2003 and the Fairfield Board of Education from 2003-2009.

Kupchick is a lifelong Fairfield resident, third generation Fairfielder.

Kupchick started a small HVAC business with her Husband 30 years ago. Peter Kupchick Heating & Cooling Inc.

Kupchick is married to Peter G Kupchick and has one adult son, Peter C. Kupchick.

References

1964 births
Living people
People from Fairfield, Connecticut
Republican Party members of the Connecticut House of Representatives
21st-century American politicians
21st-century American women politicians
Women state legislators in Connecticut